Tore Johnsen (born 5 May 1961) is a Norwegian athlete. He competed in the men's hammer throw at the 1984 Summer Olympics.

References

1961 births
Living people
Athletes (track and field) at the 1984 Summer Olympics
Norwegian male hammer throwers
Olympic athletes of Norway
Sportspeople from Gjøvik